El Dorado USD 490 is a public unified school district headquartered in El Dorado, Kansas, United States.  The district includes the communities of El Dorado, De Graff, Oil Hill, and nearby rural areas.

Schools
The school district operates the following schools:
 El Dorado High School
 Extend High School
 El Dorado Middle School
 Blackmore Elementary School
 Grandview Elementary School
 Skelly Elementary School

See also
 Kansas State Department of Education
 Kansas State High School Activities Association
 List of high schools in Kansas
 List of unified school districts in Kansas

References

External links
 

School districts in Kansas
Education in Butler County, Kansas